Claude A. Taylor (1902–1966) was an American politician and jurist who served as chief justice on the South Carolina Supreme Court. He was born in 1902 in Gilbert, South Carolina. He spent ten years serving in the General Assembly of South Carolina including as the House of Representatives' Speaker between 1935 and 1936. In 1944, Taylor gained election to the South Carolina Supreme Court and became its chief justice in 1961. Taylor began the practice of opening sessions of the court with a prayer. He died on January 21, 1966, and is buried in Spartanburg, South Carolina's Greenlawn Memorial Gardens.

References

Justices of the South Carolina Supreme Court
Chief Justices of the South Carolina Supreme Court
1902 births
1966 deaths
20th-century American judges